The Battle of Quipaipán was the decisive battle of the Inca Civil War between the brothers Atahualpa and Huáscar. After the victory at Chimborazo, Atahualpa stopped in Cajamarca as his generals followed Huáscar to the south. The second confrontation took place at Quipaipán, where Huáscar was again defeated, his army disbanded, Huáscar himself captured and - save for the intervention of Pizarro - the entire Inca empire nearly fallen to Atahualpa.

Historians know today that the battle took place a couple of miles west of the Inca capital Cusco in April 1532. According to the number of soldiers that Atahualpa kept in Cajamarca, after the battle of Chimborazo (some 80,000 men), his generals Chalicuchima and Quizquiz should have led between 50,000 and 100,000 men. Huáscar's force was probably slightly smaller and shocked, as they had been utterly beaten earlier in Ecuador.

Little of the battle is known. Atahualpa's generals won a decisive victory. They shattered Huáscar's army once again, captured Huáscar himself, and shortly thereafter conquered his capital Cusco for Atahualpa. The civil war was thereafter decided, and Atahualpa should have become sole ruler of the mighty Inca Empire had he not been captured himself by Francisco Pizarro in Cajamarca.

Bibliography

 Cevallos, Pedro Fermin (1870). Resúmen de la historia del Ecuador, desde su orijen hasta 1845. Lima.

Quipaipan
History of Cusco Region
Quipaipan
1532 in the Inca civilization
16th century in Peru